This article is a list of all 26 episodes of Future Boy Conan, an anime television series by Nippon Animation. The series began airing in Japan on 4 April 1978 at 7:30pm on the NHK TV network in Japan. It ran for about seven months, with episode 26 airing on 31 October 1978.

Episodes
{|class="wikitable" style="width:100%; margin:auto; background:#FFF;"
|-
! width="30" | # !! Title !! width="150" | Original air date

{{Episode list
| EpisodeNumber       = 26
| Title               = Finale
| TranslitTitle       = Daidan'en
| NativeTitle         = 大団円
| NativeTitleLangCode = ja 
| OriginalAirDate     = 
| ShortSummary        = On its way to High Harbor, the passenger ship recovers Conan, Dyce and Jimsy from the sea; and after asking Conan to look after Lana, Dr. Lao dies contently. Sometime later, the old and new inhabitants of High Harbor conduct a double celebration surrounding Dyce and Monsley's wedding and the relaunch of the Barracuda. Many of the new settlers, including Conan, Lana, Jimsy, Tera, Luke, Monsley and the Barracuda'''s crew, leave to establish a new colony on Remnant Island, now expanded by the cataclysm into a new continent.
}}
|}

References
 General
 

 Specific

See alsoFuture Boy Conan''

Future Boy Conan